Austrodolichos is a genus of flowering plants in the legume family, Fabaceae. It belongs to the subfamily Faboideae.

Description
These plants are vines with tuberous roots. The stems are covered in simple hairs.  Leaves are 3-foliolate with upper surfaces darker than the lower surface. The inflorescences are axillary, with one or two stemmed pink to purple flowers.

Uses
Root tubers of Austrodolichos species have been traditional food for Aborigines of the Northern Territory.

References

Phaseoleae
Fabaceae genera